Nebria meanyi is a species of ground beetle in the Nebriinae subfamily that can be found in Canada and in the U.S. states such as California, Oregon, and Washington.

References

meanyi
Beetles described in 1925
Beetles of North America